Myrtle is an unincorporated community in Mingo County, West Virginia, United States. Myrtle had a post office, which opened on September 2, 1891, and closed on August 22, 1992.

References

Unincorporated communities in Mingo County, West Virginia
Unincorporated communities in West Virginia